Jon Friedberg is an American professional poker player and business owner.  In his World Series of Poker career he has finished in the money 14 times including two Final Tables and one WSOP bracelet.

As of 2010, his lifetime career tournament earnings total $1,031,447.  His 14 WSOP cashes accounting for $746,147 of that.

World Series of Poker Bracelets

References 

Living people
World Series of Poker bracelet winners
American poker players
Year of birth missing (living people)